Baybek is a rural locality (a selo) and the administrative center of Baybeksky Selsoviet, Krasnoyarsky District, Astrakhan Oblast, Russia. The population was 1,911 as of 2010. There are 17 streets.

Geography 
Baybek is located on the Kigach River, 22 km northeast of Krasny Yar (the district's administrative centre) by road. Maly Aral is the nearest rural locality.

References 

Rural localities in Krasnoyarsky District, Astrakhan Oblast